Sugar Grove Township  is the name of several places in the United States:

Sugar Grove Township, Kane County, Illinois
Sugar Grove Township, Dallas County, Iowa
Sugar Grove Township, Mercer County, Pennsylvania
Sugar Grove Township, Warren County, Pennsylvania

See also
Sugar Grove (disambiguation)

Township name disambiguation pages